Non-representational theory is the study of a specific theory focused on human geography. It is the work of Nigel Thrift (Warwick University).  The theory is based on using social theory, conducting geographical research, and the 'embodied experience.'

Definition 
Instead of studying and representing social relationships, non-representational theory focuses upon practices – how human and nonhuman formations are enacted or performed – not simply on what is produced. "First, it valorizes those processes  that operate before … conscious, reflective thought … [and] second, it insists on the  necessity of not prioritizing representations  as the primary epistemological vehicles through which knowledge is extracted from the world". Recent studies have examined a wide range of activities including dance, musical performance, walking, gardening, rave, listening to music and children's play.

Post-structuralist origins
This is a post-structuralist theory inspired in part by the ideas of the physicist-philosopher Niels Bohr, and thinkers such as Michel Foucault, Gilles Deleuze, Félix Guattari, Bruno Latour, Michel Serres and Karen Barad, and by phenomenonologists such as Martin Heidegger and Maurice Merleau-Ponty. More recently it considers views from political science (including ideas about radical democracy) and anthropological discussions of the material dimensions of human life. It parallels the conception of "hybrid geographies" developed by Sarah Whatmore.

Criticism
Critics have suggested that Thrift's use of the term "non-representational theory" is problematic, and that other non-representational theories could be developed. Richard G. Smith said that Baudrillard's work could be considered a "non-representational theory", for example, which has fostered some debate. In 2005, Hayden Lorimer (Glasgow University) said that the term "more-than-representational" was preferable.

References

Macpherson, H. (2010), Non‐Representational Approaches to Body–Landscape Relations. Geography Compass, 4: 1-13. doi:10.1111/j.1749-8198.2009.00276.x

Human geography
Enactive cognition